Clement Wellington (17 August 1880 – 26 July 1956) was an Australian cricketer. He played one first-class match for Western Australia in 1905/06.

See also
 List of Western Australia first-class cricketers

References

External links
 

1880 births
1956 deaths
Australian cricketers
Western Australia cricketers